Mihai Pătraş is a Moldovan politician.

Biography 

He served as a member of the Parliament of Moldova and is a leader of the Democratic Forum of Romanians in Moldova.

External links  
 Cine au fost şi ce fac deputaţii primului Parlament din R. Moldova (1990-1994)? 
 Declaraţia deputaţilor din primul Parlament 
 Site-ul Parlamentului Republicii Moldova

References 

Living people
Moldovan MPs 1990–1994
Popular Front of Moldova MPs
Year of birth missing (living people)